The Midland Football League is a currently-active association football league in England, founded in 2014.

Midland Football League may refer to:
Midland Football League (1889), former association football league in England (1889–1982)
Midland Football League (1994), former association football league in England (1994–2005)
Midland Football League (Scotland), former association football league in Scotland (1891–1911)
Midlands Football League, association football league in Scotland, formed in 2021 by the East Region of the Scottish Junior Football Association